The Mai Dịch Cemetery is a cemetery in Hanoi, Vietnam, which houses the graves of Communist government leaders and famous revolutionaries.

Burials

Notable burials include:
 Phùng Chí Kiên (died 1941)
 Nguyễn Sơn (d. 1956)
 Nguyễn Chí Thanh (d. 1967)
 Nguyễn Lương Bằng (d. 1979)
 Tôn Đức Thắng (d. 1980)
 Nguyễn Phan Chánh (d. 1984)
 Xuân Thủy (d. 1985)
 Xuân Diệu (d. 1985)
 Hoàng Văn Thái (d. 1986)
 Lê Duẩn (d. 1986)
 Trần Quốc Hoàn (d. 1986)
 Lê Trọng Tấn (d. 1986)
 Phạm Hùng (d. 1988)
 Phạm Huy Thông (d. 1988)
 Trường Chinh (d. 1988)
 Giáp Văn Cương (d. 1990)
 Lê Đức Thọ (d. 1990)
 Văn Cao (d. 1995)
 Nguyễn Khắc Viện (d. 1997)
 Nguyễn Cơ Thạch (d 1998)
 Đoàn Khuê (d. 1999)
 Lê Quang Đạo (d. 1999)
 Phạm Văn Đồng (d. 2000)
 Văn Tiến Dũng (d. 2002)
 Tố Hữu (d. 2002)
 Nguyễn Đình Thi (d. 2003)
 Trần Hoàn (d. 2003)
 Lê Minh Hương (d. 2004)
 Huy Cận (d. 2005)
 Vũ Kỳ (d. 2005)
 Huy Du (d. 2007)
 Trần Lâm (d. 2011)
 Hồ Đức Việt (d. 2013)
 Trần Văn Quang (d. 2013)
 Lê Khả Phiêu (d. 2020)

References

External links
 

Cemeteries in Vietnam
Buildings and structures in Hanoi